Michael John Maslowski (born July 11, 1974) is a former American football linebacker in the National Football League (NFL) for the Kansas City Chiefs. He attended the University of Wisconsin–La Crosse.

Amateur career
The Wisconsin–La Crosse star earned Division III All-America honors as a senior. Maslowski finished his college career with 279 tackles, 21.0 tackles for a loss, 5.5 sacks, and 10 interceptions. He was part of the UW – La Crosse Eagles 1995 National Championship team as a junior when he had a career-high 108 tackles. Maslowski made 128 tackles and 13 interceptions to earn all-state honors as a senior at Thorp High School in Thorp, Wisconsin.

Professional career
In 1997, Maslowski signed as a rookie free agent with the San Diego Chargers, but was cut by the team prior to the start of the regular season.  In 1998, he played in the Arena Football League for the San Jose Sabercats. In 1999, Maslowski signed a contract with the Kansas City Chiefs of the NFL.  The Chief then allocated him to NFL Europe where he played one season for the Barcelona Dragons of NFL Europe in 1999 where he set the single season record for tackles with 105 tackles, breaking the previous record of 95 tackles set by Anthony Fieldings of the Rhein Fire. Maslowski is the only player in the history of the NFL Europe to record a 100 tackle season. As a member of the Dragons, Maslowski was twice named the NFL Europe Defensive Player of the Week, was the Defensive Player of the Year, and helped lead his team to play in World Bowl VII against the Frankfurt Galaxy.

Maslowski joined the Chiefs in 1999, after the conclusion of the 1999 NFL Europe season, and played a significant role of the Chiefs special teams, earning the Chiefs' prestigious Mack Lee Hill Award, which is awarded to the most outstanding rookie of the team.  His 2001 season was plagued by two major knee injuries, tearing his MCL and PCL in his left knee, but in the 2002 season he earned a spot at linebacker.  In the 2002 season, Maslowski recorded 162 tackles, 109 of which were solo tackles, and broke the Chiefs single season record in tackles, which had previously been 157 tackles set by linebacker Gary Spani in 1979. This record was later broken by Derrick Johnson with 179 tackles. This record would be surpassed by Nick Bolton with 180 tackles in 2022

In 2003, Maslowski's season, and ultimately his career, were cut short by recurrent knee injuries which he first sustained in 2001.  His MCL and PCL were completely torn from bone on his left leg and he underwent a tibial osteotomy which is designed to correct the alignment of the knee.  He was only the second professional athlete to attempt a return to playing after undergoing such a surgery, the other was Steve Yzerman of the Detroit Red Wings.  During training camp in the 2004 season, Maslowski attempted to make a comeback, but his left knee was not at full strength and the Chiefs placed him on the injured reserve.  Again in 2005, he attempted a comeback, but decided to retire because he was not achieving his full potential.

On December 13, 2005, the Green Bay Packers worked out Maslowski, but did not sign him.

Coaching career
Maslowski joined the Hamburg Sea Devils of NFL Europe in 2006 and was also the linebacker coach for the team.

NFL career statistics

References

1974 births
American football middle linebackers
Kansas City Chiefs players
Barcelona Dragons players
Living people
Wisconsin–La Crosse Eagles football players
People from Thorp, Wisconsin
Players of American football from Wisconsin
San Jose SaberCats players